Women Who Work is a 1938  Argentine comedy film drama directed by Manuel Romero. The film premiered in Buenos Aires and starred Tito Lusiardo.

In a 2022 poll of The 100 Greatest Films of Argentine Cinema presented at the Mar del Plata International Film Festival, the film reached number 49.

Cast
Mecha Ortiz... 	Ana María del Solar
Tito Lusiardo	... 	Lorenzo Ramos
Niní Marshall	... 	Catita
Pepita Serrador	... 	Luisa
Alicia Barrié	... 	Clara
Fernando Borel	... 	Carlos Suárez Roldán
Sabina Olmos	... 	Elvira
Alita Román... 	Anita
Mary Parets	... 	Marta Suárez Roldán
Enrique Roldán	... 	Andrés Stanley
Hilda Sour	... 	Dolores Campos
Alímedes Nelson	... 	Emilia
María Vitaliani	... 	Doña Petrona
Berta Aliana	... 	Dora
Alicia Aymont	... 	Mrs. Suárez Roldán

References

External links

1938 films
1930s Spanish-language films
Argentine black-and-white films
1938 comedy films
Films directed by Manuel Romero
Argentine comedy films
1930s Argentine films